Saguaro High School is a former A+ and Blue Ribbon Schools Program certified high school in the Scottsdale Unified School District in Scottsdale, Arizona, United States. Saguaro was opened in 1966.

Sports
Saguaro's varsity football program has won an Arizona state championship thirteen times (1995, 2006, 2007, 2008, 2010, 2011, 2013, 2014, 2015, 2016, 2017, 2018, 2021).

The varsity baseball program is three time state champions (1992, 2010 and 2011).

The varsity boys' basketball program has won three state championships (1990, 1996, and 2004). The varsity girls' basketball program won one state title, in 2013.

The SHS varsity golf programs have combined for four state titles (boys' golf in 1977 and 1990; girls' golf in 1997 and 1998).

The girls' swim and dive team won one state title, in 1971.

Saguaro Track and Field has had several athletes win state: in the 4x440yrd relay in 1978, in the 300m hurdles in 1995, in the 3200m run in 2016 and 2017, and the 100m, 200m and 4x100m relay in 2018 and 2019 respectively. 

The men's tennis teams through 2009-2013 reached the state playoffs four years in a row led by the 2013 senior class.

The Saguaro senior class of 1996 won the school's first ever football state championship, and also won the basketball state championship. The baseball team lost in the state championship final, finishing 2nd in the state.

Performing arts

Saguaro High School has five disciplines in its performing arts department: orchestra, band, dance, theater, and choir.

Notable alumni

Professional athletes
 T.J. Beam, former MLB player (New York Yankees, Pittsburgh Pirates)
 Jeremy Brigham, NFL player (Oakland Raiders)
 Mike Brown, All-Pro defensive back, Chicago Bears
 Angi Cipra, gymnast (UCLA Bruins)
 D. J. Foster, NFL player (Arizona Cardinals)
 Dale Hellestrae, football player; offensive lineman for the Buffalo Bills, Dallas Cowboys, and Baltimore Ravens; played for three Dallas Cowboys Super Bowl teams
 Jason Kershner, former MLB player (Toronto Blue Jays, San Diego Padres)
 Christian Kirk, NFL player (Arizona Cardinals)
 Byron Murphy, NFL player (Arizona Cardinals)
 Jay Pettibone, former MLB player (Minnesota Twins)

Entertainment and media
 Matt Barrie, ESPN SportsCenter anchor
 Sandra Bernhard, actress and comedian
 Scott Johnson, musician in the Gin Blossoms, class of '81
 Chelsea Kane, actress (attended for one year, then moved to California)
 J. S. Lewis, fiction writer
 Rick Lord, news anchor, WCHS-TV Charleston WV
 John Joseph "J.R." Moehringer, novelist and journalist, class of '82
 Neal Pollack, novelist and humor writer
 Richard Sala, artist, cartoonist, author
 David Spade, actor, comedian and producer, class of '82

Government
 Bruce Rauner, former Governor of Illinois
 David Schweikert, U.S. Representative from Arizona's 6th Congressional district

References

External links

Scottsdale Unified School District

Educational institutions established in 1966
Public high schools in Arizona
Education in Scottsdale, Arizona
Schools in Maricopa County, Arizona
1966 establishments in Arizona